Gayane Hovhannisyan (Yerevan, 6 March 1965) is an Armenian linguist, Doctor of Sciences in Philology/Linguistics (2000), Professor (2005). Hovhannisyan was the first Chair of English (Romance and Germanic Languages) Teaching Methodology at Armenian State Pedagogical University after Khachatur Abovyan, Yerevan. Currently  she is the (acting) head of English Communication and Translation Chair at Brusov State University.

Biography 
Gayane Hovhannisyan was born in 1965 in Yerevan. In 1987 she graduated from Yerevan Institute of Russian and Foreign Languages with honors, received Ph.D. in General and Applied Linguistics at the Russian National Academy of Sciences, Institute of Linguistics, 1993, Moscow. In 2000 she obtained D.Sc. in Linguistics at Yerevan State University & Institute of Linguistics after H. Ajarian, Armenia.	

Between 1993-1996 she taught English in Moscow, held the position of Scientific Secretary at Leo Tolstoy Institute of Languages and Cultures, Moscow, Russian Federation. From 1996 to 2001 she taught English Linguistics and Psycholinguistics at the Faculty of Germanic and Romance Languages, Yerevan State University. She held higher education management positions between 1998 and 2012. 
1998-2000 - Head of Foreign Languages Department, Moscow New Institute of Law, Armenian Branch. 
2000-2007 - Founding Head of the English Language and Teaching Methodology Department at the Armenian State Pedagogical University. From 2000 to 2007 - Yerevan State Linguistic University. 
2008-2012 Head of the English Communication Chair Yerevan State Linguistic University. Between 2000 and 2013 she was a member of the Armenian YSU-NAS Doctoral Dissertation Review and  Degree Awarding Committee in Linguistics, also, in different periods, in Psychology and Education.  Between 2000 and 2013 Gayane Hovhannisyan practiced forensic linguistics. She is the author of over a dozen manuals and handbooks, a monograph, around 70 peer-reviewed articles and book chapters in Applied Linguistics, Cognitive Linguistics, Communication and Education. Her research interests include psycholinguistic categorization, semantic and associative systems of consciousness, social and psychological aspects of language personality, cognition and emotions.

Public activity and professional membership 
 UN Regional Peace Coalition. Honorary member. 1998-2002
 SOAR Muscat Chapter president 2018-2021.
 US Armenia Alumni Association.
 Association of English Language Teachers of Armenia.
 TESOL International Association.
 TESOL Arabia.
 MoES Special Expertise Committee for Evaluation of Bilingual Education.
 Armenian Team Member: UNO Regional peace-building and Reconciliation. Tbilisi, Georgia.
 UNIFEM trainer in Gender studies and peace-building for grassroot organizations.
 President of Women’s Committee. Qanaqer- Zeytoon Community, Yerevan, 
 USG Public Service Fellowship Program: faculty training in Effective Communication. 
 College Community Service. Research and Consultancy Coordinator, member of Research Ethics Committee.

Projects and awards 

 Language Education Research project presenter. TESOL ARABIA 22nd conference, UAE.
 UASP Visiting Scholar, Appalachian State University, NC, USA.
 Secondary School Teachers’ Professional Development Program and Training Guide. MoES, RA and ABU Consulting, NL 
 Quality and Relevance of Education”. Curriculum Development, Interactive Language Teaching Methods, Language Testing and Assessment, MoES, RA.
 “Effective Communication” course for graduate, post-graduate students. IREX PSFP grant, Brusov Linguistic University. 
 Content-Based Language Teaching Project- ConBaT+ European Centre for Modern Languages. Graz, Austria.
 Linvapark - Ways of Modeling Intercultural Communicative Competence for the Languages of the Commonwealth of Independent States. Moscow, Russia.
 Multiple Component Curriculum Development and Teacher Education Project. Author, editor. USA ECA, IREX. 
 CCHS visiting scholar, RCEAL, Second Language Acquisition, Cambridge University, UK. 
 IREX visiting scholar, Graduate School of Education, George Mason University, VA, USA.
 Medal for Dedicated Work. Armenian State Pedagogical University after Kh. Abovian.

Selected publications 
Monograph
 The Psycholinguistic Concept of Time. Yerevan: Paruyr Sevak. 2001.

Books
 Introduction to Psycholinguistics. 2003. Yerevan, 101 pages. 
 Constructivist Teaching Methodology. IREX-ECA, Yerevan, 335pages. 2003.
 Foundations and Methods of Constructivist Education. IREX-ECA, 2nd revised edition, Yerevan, 257 pages.2004. 
 Integrated Approach to Curriculum Development. IREX-ECA, 2nd revised edition, Yerevan, 360 pages. 2004. 
 English. Manual and Guide for In-Service English Language Teacher Training within the framework of WB and Ministry of Education and Science project. 113 pages. 2008.
 Language Assessment and Testing. Manual for Training of In-Service English Language Teachers. 111 pages. 2009.
 An English-Armenian Guide to Polite Expressions. Yerevan, 116 pages. 2009.
 Psycholinguistics. Manual for Graduate school of Linguistics, MoES, Yerevan, 179 pages. 2011..
 English. A Manual and Guide for English Language In-Service Teacher Training, Yerevan.2011.
 Psychology in English. A CLIL Textbook. Level B2, Yerevan, Europrint, 112 pages. 2012.
 Psychology in English.  A CLIL Textbook. Level B2+, Yerevan Europrint, 112 pages. 2012.
 Psychology in English. A CLIL Textbook. Level C1, Yerevan Europrint, 130 pages. 2012.
 Psychology in English. The Teacher’s Handbook. Yerevan Europrint, 122 pages.2012. 
 Handbook of Armenian and English Language Documentation and Description. EREA, 129 pages.2014.

Book Chapters and Articles
 Hovhannisyan, G.R. (2022). The Architecture of Language Personality. In: Al-Mahrooqi, R., Denman, C.J. (eds) Individual and Contextual Factors in the English Language Classroom. English Language Education, vol 24. Springer, Cham. 
 Hovhannisyan, G.R. (2022). Psycholinguistic Competencies and Interculturality in ELT. In: Al-Mahrooqi, R., Denman, C.J. (eds) Individual and Contextual Factors in the English Language Classroom. English Language Education, vol 24. Springer, Cham. 
 Hovhannisyan, G.R. (2018). Incorporating Intercultural Research into ELL/ELT in Oman. In: Al-Mahrooqi, R., Denman, C. (eds) English Education in Oman. English Language Education, vol 15. Springer, Singapore. 
 The time of human thoughts and deeds. A cognitive discourse analysis of Hamlet and Macbeth. Cognitive Linguistic Studies, v.5/2 pages 410-425 John Benjamins, 2018.  
 "Acquisition of Language Meanings via Smart Technologies" Journal for Teaching ESPEAP, V4/1, pages 23-37, 2016.  (Print).  (Online) 
 Incorporating Intercultural Research into ELL/ELT in Oman. In English Education in Oman. Current Scenarios and Future Trajectories. pages 85-102, Springer, 2018. 
 A Case Study in Faculty Development. Appalachian State University, NC, USA. Published Online. IREX, 2010.
 Assessment and Rubrics. In “Modern Approaches and Perspectives in Education”, IREX-ECA, Yerevan, pp. 57–69.
 Complex Issues of Assessment. In “Modern Approaches and Perspectives in Education”, IREX-ECA, Yerevan, pp. 85–92.

Book review
 Review of The Universal Theory of Language by academician G. Djahukyan. IRAN AND THE CAUCASUS, vol.5, Tehran,2001. pp. 43–48

References

External links 
 Gayane Hovhannisyan's biography

1965 births
Linguists from Armenia
Living people
Academic staff of the Yerevan Brusov State University of Languages and Social Sciences